Paula Doepfner (born in Berlin - July 1980) is a German artist. She lives and works in Berlin, Germany. Paula Doepfner's multimedia body of work encompasses textual works on paper, reinforced glass objects, installations in glass, ice and organic matter and sound performances. Her drawings, delineated in miniature script on fine Japanese paper, are based on sketches made while observing brain operations and autopsies at the Charité Berlin. The texts themselves are drawn from neuroscientific research and medical documents on human rights abuses. They also bear traces of philosophical and lyrical sources such as Anne Carson, Paul Celan, Joyce Mansour and Robert Musil. Doepfner’s work combines various perspectives on states of mind, incorporates the passing of time and lays bare subcutaneous organic structures. Her work proceeds from what constitutes human experience, a complex combination of science, philosophy, literature and art.

Life and career
Doepfner graduated from Chelsea College of Art and Design, where she studied with Roger Ackling and she graduated from the Berlin University of the Arts as master student of Rebecca Horn. Her works are part of public collections such as Kupferstichkabinett Berlin.

Solo exhibitions
2022 "I went to the crossroads", Akademie der Konrad Adenauer Stiftung, Berlin, Germany
2021 "Today and tomorrow, and yesterday, too, the flowers are dyin' like all things do", Konrad Adenauer Stiftung, Berlin, Germany
2019 "For the trees to drop" Stiftung St. Matthäus, Berlin, Germany
2018 "Next Time I See You", Galleria Mario Iannelli, Rome, Italy
2017 "Babe, I’ve left you somewhere in the rain", Una Vetrina, Rome, Italy
2016 "Put it right here (or keep it out there)" Kunstverein Reutlingen, Germany
2015 "Take It Right Back" Goethe Institute, Washington, D.C.
2014 "Whatever gets you through the night, it's alright, it's alright," Galerie Tanja Wagner, Berlin
2014 "When Lilacs Last in the Dooryard Bloomed," Galerie Laurent Mueller, Paris
2013 "Rollin' High And Mighty Traps," S2A, New York; Performance with Steve Whipple
2012 "Try my dear," Galerie Tanja Wagner, Berlin
2012 "More than I can hide," Kunstverein Östliches Sauerland, Germany
2011 "But my nerves were kicking," Ionion Center for the Arts, Kefalonia
2011 "Mehr Zeit bedeutet nicht mehr Ewigkeit," Performance with Hakeem Holloway, Berlin Art Junction
2010 "Promessus," Galerie Tanja Wagner, Berlin
2010 "Fallen," Stadtmühle Willisau, Lucerne
2009 "Im Schlaf ohne Schlaf," St. Johannes Evangelist-Kirche, Berlin; Performance with Gregor Fuhrmann

References

External links
http://pauladoepfner.com/
http://www.berlinartjunction.org/clients/gtz/ex_05/katalog_05_giz_20120125002_internet_version.pdf

1980 births
German artists
Living people
Alumni of Chelsea College of Arts
Berlin University of the Arts alumni